Steve Young (July 12, 1942 – March 17, 2016) was an American country music singer, songwriter and guitarist, known for his song "Seven Bridges Road" (on Rock Salt & Nails & Seven Bridges Road). He was a pioneer of the country rock, Americana, and alternative country sounds, and also a vital force behind the "outlaw movement" that gave support to the careers of Waylon Jennings, Hank Williams, Jr. and more. Young was also featured in the 1975 Outlaw Country documentary Heartworn Highways. He was the subject of the song "The All Golden" by Van Dyke Parks. Young's first album, Rock Salt & Nails, on A&M, featured Gram Parsons, Gene Clark, and other musicians from the 1969 musical community in Southern California.

Biography
Born in Newnan, Georgia, United States, he grew up in Gadsden, Alabama, and the state of Texas, moving from place to place as his family searched for work. By the time he had completed high school, Young was playing and writing songs that incorporated influences of folk, blues, country and gospel, that he absorbed while travelling throughout the South. In the late 1960s, he worked with Van Dyke Parks and was member of the psychedelic country band Stone Country.

Young wrote many songs, including "Lonesome, On'ry and Mean" (covered by Waylon Jennings) and "Montgomery In the Rain" (covered by Hank Williams, Jr.).

During the late 1970s, Young became a Buddhist and a vegetarian.

His best-known composition is "Seven Bridges Road", which became a hit for Eagles when they included a cover of it on their live album in 1980.  Earlier covers of the song were done by Joan Baez, Tracy Nelson & Mother Earth, Iain Matthews, Dolly Parton, and Rita Coolidge.

In 1984, Young charted the single "It's Not Supposed to Be That Way" on RCA Records. It peaked at No. 84 on Hot Country Songs. In 1989, Young did a mini tour in the Northwest with singer-songwriter Tim Otto, performing in Portland, Oregon, and Seattle, Washington. In 1991, Otto took the cover shot for Steve Young's Solo/Live CD on Watermelon Records. Townes Van Zandt wrote the liner notes. The 1996 concert recording by Van Dyke Parks entitled Moonlighting: Live at the Ash Grove (released in 1998) was headlined by Young, although he did not appear on the recordings.

In 1993, Young played a show in Lichtenvoorde, The Netherlands, together with David Olney. This show then was recorded by SCR Productions. Olney's track were released on his Live in Holland album in 1994.  In 2019, an album of Young's tracks was released, also titled Live in Holland. David Olney took care of the liner notes, and performed on a few tracks on harmonica.

Steve Young had been in declining health since suffering a head injury sustained in a fall in October 2015. He died after a brief stay in a Nashville, Tennessee hospice, on March 17, 2016. He was 73.

Discography

(1) Differs from 1972 release in that one new track was added and all other tracks were remixed.

References

External links
 
 
 

1942 births
2016 deaths
American male singer-songwriters
American country rock singers
American country singer-songwriters
People from Newnan, Georgia
Country musicians from Georgia (U.S. state)
Singer-songwriters from Georgia (U.S. state)